UTC+11:30 is an identifier for a time offset from UTC of +11:30.

History
This time zone has been used as standard time in New Zealand and Norfolk Island, but is no longer used as a time zone anywhere.

On November 2, 1868, New Zealand officially adopted a standard time to be observed nationally, and was perhaps the first country to do so. It was based on the longitude 172° 30' East of Greenwich, that was 11 hours 30 minutes ahead of Greenwich Mean Time. This standard was known as New Zealand Mean Time (NZMT). Today this would be around the same zone covered by UTC+11:30. New Zealand changed from NZMT to New Zealand Standard Time (NZST) as UTC+12:00 in 1946 (after using this time zone as a daylight saving time since 1928, including permanent daylight saving from 1941). It was officially changed to 12 hours in advance of UTC in 1946.

Norfolk Island's standard time (NFT) was on UTC+11:30 until 4 October 2015, when it was changed to UTC+11:00.

See also
Time in Australia
Time in New Zealand

References

UTC offsets

es:Huso horario#UTC+11:30, L†